Bath United, known as CCC Bath United for sponsorship reasons, is a Nevisian association football club based in Bath. The team has won one Nevis Premier Division title, in 2004.

Squad 
As of 17 February 2014.

Honors 
 Nevis Premier Division: 1
2004

References 

Bath United